In architecture, a corbel is a structural piece of stone, wood or metal jutting from a wall to carry a superincumbent weight, a type of bracket. A corbel is a solid piece of material in the wall, whereas a console is a piece applied to the structure. A piece of timber projecting in the same way was called a "tassel" or a "bragger" in England.

The technique of corbelling, where rows of corbels deeply keyed inside a wall support a projecting wall or parapet, has been used since Neolithic (New Stone Age) times. It is common in medieval architecture and in the Scottish baronial style as well as in the vocabulary of classical architecture, such as the modillions of a Corinthian cornice. The corbel arch and corbel vault use the technique systematically to make openings in walls and to form ceilings.  These are found in the early architecture of most cultures, from Eurasia to Pre-Columbian architecture.

A console is more specifically an "S"-shaped scroll bracket in the classical tradition, with the upper or inner part larger than the lower (as in the first illustration) or outer.  Keystones are also often in the form of consoles.  Whereas "corbel" is rarely used outside architecture, "console" is widely used for furniture, as in console table, and other decorative arts where the motif appears.

Decorated corbels
Norman (Romanesque) corbels often have a plain appearance, although they may be elaborately carved with stylised heads of humans, animals or imaginary "beasts", and sometimes with other motifs (Kilpeck church in Herefordshire is a notable example, with 85 of its original 91 richly carved corbels still surviving).

Similarly, in the Early English period corbels were sometimes elaborately carved, as at Lincoln Cathedral, and sometimes more simply so.

Corbels sometimes end with a point apparently growing into the wall, or forming a knot, and often are supported by angels and other figures. In the later periods the carved foliage and other ornaments used on corbels resemble those used in the capitals of columns.

Throughout England, in half-timber work, wooden corbels ("tassels" or "braggers") abound, carrying window-sills or oriel windows in wood, which also are often carved.

Classical architecture
The corbels carrying balconies in Italy and France were sometimes of great size and richly carved, and some of the finest examples of the Italian Cinquecento (16th century) style are found in them. Taking a cue from 16th-century practice, the Paris-trained designers of 19th-century Beaux-Arts architecture were encouraged to show imagination in varying corbels.

Corbel tables

A corbel table is a projecting moulded string course supported by a range of corbels. Sometimes these corbels carry a small arcade under the string course, the arches of which are pointed and trefoiled. As a rule, the corbel table carries the gutter, but in Lombard work the arcaded corbel table was used as a decoration to subdivide the storeys and break up the wall surface. In Italy sometimes over the corbels will form a moulding, and above a plain piece of projecting wall forming a parapet.

The corbels carrying the arches of the corbel tables in Italy and France were often elaborately moulded, sometimes in two or three courses projecting over one another; those carrying the machicolations of English and French castles had four courses.

In modern chimney construction, a corbel table is constructed on the inside of a flue in the form of a concrete ring beam supported by a range of corbels. The corbels can be either in-situ or pre-cast concrete. The corbel tables described here are built at approximately ten-metre intervals to ensure stability of the barrel of refractory bricks constructed thereon.

Corbelling

 
Corbelling, where rows of corbels gradually build a wall out from the vertical, has long been used as a simple kind of vaulting, for example in many Neolithic chambered cairns, where walls are gradually corbelled in until the opening can be spanned by a slab.

Corbelled vaults are very common in early architecture around the world. Different types may be called the beehive house (ancient Britain and elsewhere), the Irish clochán, the pre-Roman nuraghe of Sardinia, and the tholos tombs (or "beehive tombs") of Late Bronze Age Greece and other parts of the Mediterranean.

In medieval architecture the technique was used to support upper storeys or a parapet projecting forward from the wall plane, often to form machicolation (openings between corbels could be used to drop things onto attackers). This later became a decorative feature, without the openings. Corbelling supporting upper stories and particularly supporting projecting corner turrets subsequently became a characteristic of the Scottish baronial style.

Medieval timber-framed buildings often employ jettying, where upper stories are cantilevered out on projecting wooden beams in a similar manner to corbelling.

Gallery
Short visual history of corbels

See also
Atlas (architecture)
Dentil
Eaves
Fireplace mantel
Modillion
Muqarna

Notes

References

Citations

Sources 

The CRSBI (Corpus of ROMANESQUE SCULPTURE in Britain and Ireland) website has many examples of carved Norman corbels

External links 

  Beyond-the-pale—A discursive and richly-illustrated website showing corbels on hundreds of churches in the British Isles, France and Spain, depicting the sins of the flesh and their punishment
 An Illustrated Masonry Glossary

Architectural elements
Fortification (architectural elements)
Garden features
Ornaments (architecture)
Scottish baronial architecture
Traditional East Asian Architecture